Rohit Iyengar (born August 31, 1995) is a Dubai-based Indian artist most notable for his video "Malls of Dubai" and the Auto-Tune Remix of Indian politician Rahul Gandhi. “Malls of Dubai” has so far received over 200,000 hits on YouTube  and has been covered by several UAE newspapers.
Rohit Iyengar has so far posted over 100 videos on YouTube with a total of over a million video views.

Malls of Dubai
The song was uploaded on August 28, 2011 on the YouTube channel SPRProductionsYT and currently has over 200,000 hits. It features Rohit rapping about the Malls of Dubai and their unique aspects. "I'm in Dubai. I'm going to the mall. There's so many to choose from, I don't know where to go. You got big ones, small ones and all of them are awesome. There's so many to choose from, I don't know where to go." are the chorus lyrics. The video shows him rapping inside the malls themselves or using computer effects (Chroma Key) to make the malls appear behind him.

Composition
The song is recorded at a constant tempo of 75 beats per minute in the key of A minor and follows the structure: Intro, Chorus, Verse 1, Chorus, Verse 2, Chorus, End. The description on YouTube states "The music itself is inspired by ET (Katy Perry), We Will Rock You (Queen), Fight to Win (Your Favorite Martian) and the lyrical magic of DeStorm!"

Response
The song gained widespread notoriety for its casual racism and use of the voice effect Auto-Tune, and many have compared Rohit to Rebecca Black On September 22, 2011 the song was featured on Yahoo! Maktoob, which is Yahoo!'s official arm in the MENA region. As of now the video has over 772 likes and over 500 dislikes.

Rahul Gandhi Auto-Tune Remix
The two-minute clip, which was released in January 2014 before the Indian General Election, 2014, shows Rahul Gandhi singing "Congress party ko desh se nikalo (Drive the Congress party out of the country)." The video was taken down from YouTube for alleged copyright infringement four days after its release before which it amassed 229,319 views, 276 comments, 2,853 likes and 128 dislikes. It was subsequently shared by several other users of the video-sharing website on their own channels turning it into a viral phenomenon. The video, eventually reinstated to YouTube, currently has 290,000 views.

Apology Video
Following the video’s take down, Rohit Iyengar released a tongue-in-cheek apology video titled “SORRY I AUTOTUNED YOU MR. RAHUL GANDHI”.

References

1995 births
Living people